The 1954 Great Britain Lions tour was a tour by the Great Britain national rugby league team of Australia and New Zealand which took place between May and August 1954. Captained by Dickie Williams, the tour involved a schedule of 32 games: 22 in Australia and 10 in New Zealand, with two three-match Test Series against both nations. 
The tour began inauspiciously, with Great Britain losing four of their first seven matches, including the First Test against Australia in Sydney. Moving into the Queensland leg, the Lions' results improved, and they won all nine of their matches in the state. This included victory in the Second Test in Brisbane. 
A common feature of many of the tour matches was rough play, punches being throw in and out of tackles. The July 10 match against New South Wales was abandoned by the referee seventeen minutes into the second half due to persistent brawling by the players. 
One week after the abandoned game, Australia won the Third Test to claim the Ashes by a 2-1 margin. 
Moving to New Zealand, Great Britain lost the Second Test, but recovered to win the Third Test and the series, by a 2-1 margin.
The tour concluded with three matches in five days back in Australia at Sydney, Canberra and Maitland. 
Despite being a British team – five of the squad were Welsh, two from Scotland and hooker Tom McKinney from Northern Ireland – the team played, and were often referred to by both the press at home and away, as England.

Squad

Australian Leg

1st Test

2nd Test

3rd Test

New Zealand leg

1st Test

2nd Test

3rd Test

Australian return Leg

Statistics
Brian Carlson, Clive Churchill, Keith Holman, Ken Kearney, and Norm Provan all appeared in seven matches against Great Britain - in each instance three games for Australia, three for New South Wales and one for Sydney. The most tries scored against the Lions was six, by Brian Carlson. Keith Holman and Ken McCaffery each scored four tries. Noel Pidding scored the most points against the tourists, with 51 from three tries and 21 goals in five matches. 
In the Test Series the leading scorers were Noel Pidding 36 (Australia) and Des White 22 (New Zealand). Lewis Jones scored the most points for the Lions against both opponents, 30 against Australia and 20 against New Zealand.  
Billy Boston scored six tries in the six tests, including four against New Zealand. Dickie Williams scored three tries against Australia. Brian Carlson scored three tries in the Ashes Tests for Australia. No New Zealander scored more than a single try in their three Test series.

Sources

References

Great Britain national rugby league team tours
Rugby league tours of Australia
Rugby league tours of New Zealand
Great Britain Lions tour of Australia and New Zealand
Great Britain Lions tour of Australia and New Zealand
Great Britain Lions tour of Australia and New Zealand